Summer Pockets is a Japanese visual novel developed by Key, a brand of Visual Arts. It was released on June 29, 2018 for Windows and is rated for all ages. Summer Pockets is Key's 13th game, following its previous games such as Kanon, Air, and Clannad. An expanded version of the game titled Summer Pockets Reflection Blue was released on June 26, 2020 in Japan. Both the original game and Reflection Blue have been ported to iOS and Android devices, and the Nintendo Switch. Reflection Blue has also additionally been ported to the PlayStation 4. An English version of the original game for Windows was released by Visual Arts in 2020. The story is set on a fictional island on the Seto Inland Sea and follows the life of Hairi Takahara, a young man who uses the recent death of his grandmother as an excuse to escape to the island after an unpleasant incident. Once there, he gets to know the townsfolk of Torishirojima and multiple girls who are the focus of the story.

The gameplay in Summer Pockets follows an interactive branching plot line with multiple scenarios, and focuses on the player character gaining the favor of the four female main characters; this is expanded to seven in Reflection Blue. The game's concept is by Jun Maeda, but he did not write the scenario due to similarities in themes with Air, which he primarily wrote. Although Air also features a rural, seaside setting during the summer, the development team aimed for Summer Pockets to have a different feeling to it. Nostalgia and the maternal bond are prominent themes in the game. An anime adaptation has been announced.

Gameplay
Summer Pockets is a romance visual novel in which the player assumes the role of Hairi Takahara. Much of its gameplay is spent on reading the story's narrative and dialogue. The text in the game is accompanied by character sprites, which represent who Hairi is talking to, over background art. Throughout the game, the player encounters CG artwork at certain points in the story, which take the place of the background art and character sprites. When the game is completed at least once, a gallery of the viewed CGs and played background music becomes available on the game's title screen. Summer Pockets follows a branching plot line with multiple endings, and depending on the decisions that the player makes during the game, the plot will progress in a specific direction.

There are six main plot lines to experience, which is increased to ten in Summer Pockets Reflection Blue. Four of the six plot lines are initially available in Summer Pockets, and seven of the ten plot lines are initially available in Reflection Blue. Throughout gameplay, the player is given multiple options to choose from, and text progression pauses at these points until a choice is made. Some decisions can lead the game to end prematurely, which offer an alternative ending to the plot. To view all plot lines in their entirety, the player will have to replay the game multiple times and choose different choices to further the plot to an alternate direction. All heroine routes are available when first playing both Summer Pockets and Reflection Blue. In both versions, each heroine will disappear from the game's title screen once her route has been completed. When all of the heroine routes in either version have been played at least once, an additional scenario called Alka is made available. Upon the completion of the Alka route, another scenario called Pocket is made available, which serves as the true conclusion to the story. In Reflection Blue, Umi's route becomes available after the completion of Pocket. In both versions, once Pocket is completed, all heroines reappear on the game's title screen.

There are two minigames featured in Summer Pockets and Reflection Blue. The first is a table tennis minigame that takes the form of a quick time event where the object is to click one of the circular indicators on the player's side at the moment when the ball hits it. Successive hits on any of the indicators will result in the filling of an intensity gauge and will increase the number of indicators from three to five which frequently change position. Successive hits on any one indicator will change its color from blue, to yellow, red, purple, and finally a multicolored "Super Shot!!" indicator. The accuracy of the clicks is scored from good, to great, and finally excellent. Play continues until either the intensity gauge is depleted, resulting in the player's loss, or until the player has accumulated enough points to knock out the opponent. In Reflection Blue, the table tennis minigame now also features doubles matches with the same basic mechanics.

The second minigame is an intricate catching and battling game called Islamon. There are 100 different Islamon to catch in 10 separate locations around the island with 20 kinds of bait. Any bait can be used in any location, but only one to four kinds of Islamon are available per bait, per location. The encounter rate for each Islamon also depends on the bait used in a certain location. For example, using Sugared Water in the Mountains results in a 25% encounter rate for a Cabbage Butterfly, but using the same bait at the Beach results in a 30% encounter rate for the same Islamon. The encounter rates for Islamon range from 5–100% (30 of the 200 permutations have a single Islamon that can be encountered). The player starts with three kinds of bait and three locations to set them. At first, the player can set two traps with bait per day, but this can increase to five per day depending on the player's rank.

A player can battle with their Islamon against an opponent twice per day, with each player allowed to use up to three Islamon per battle. Each Islamon has both a star rating from 1–5 and one of three types—Water, Wind or Earth—where Water beats Wind, Wind beats Earth, and Earth beats Water. Players customize their stock of available Islamon and choose which ones to battle with and in what order, but the rest of the battle occurs automatically. The goal of the battles is to increase in rank among 35 other individuals, and defeating an opponent will result in switching ranks with them. This continues until the player achieves rank 8, and from then on, the player can only gain one rank with each victory. Once the player defeats the players ranked 7 up to 2, the player can then battle the rank 1 opponent as the final boss. Unexpected events can occur during battle based on the relationships certain Islamon have with a given opponent.

Synopsis
Summer Pockets is set on an isolated, rural and peaceful island on the Seto Inland Sea called Torishirojima, which has a population of about 2,000 people. The protagonist is Hairi Takahara, a young man not native to the island. Hairi grew up in an urban setting, but after an unpleasant incident, he uses the recent death of his grandmother as an excuse to come to the island to take care of her estate sale. Once there, he gets to know four girls who are the focus of the story. They include Shiroha Naruse, who forgot her summer vacation; Ao Sorakado, who is pursuing the legends of the island; Kamome Kushima, a high-class girl looking for a pirate ship; and Tsumugi Wenders, a younger girl trying to find herself.

Characters

Main

Others

Development
Before the production of Summer Pockets began, Key was in the process of developing Angel Beats! 1st Beat (2015) and Harmonia (2016). At that time in early 2015, scenario writer Yūto Tonokawa was leading a new project for another visual novel, but this project was postponed to focus on Angel Beats! and Harmonia. Tonokawa later resigned from Key prior to the release of Angel Beats! 1st Beat in June 2015, and the project he was leading was subsequently abandoned. Following this, Kai was brought in to direct a new project, which would later become Summer Pockets. An in-house competition among Visual Arts employees was conducted to submit ideas for the new project as long as it was based around a concept involving an enjoyable, everyday life and a tearful story, but otherwise not being constrained by previous works by Key.

When discussion began regarding Key's new work, Jun Maeda talked it over with Takahiro Baba, the president of Visual Arts, and Maeda was adamant that the new project needed to make readers cry. Maeda went on to say that if their next work could not achieve that, it would mean the end for Key. Among the ideas was one submitted by scenario writer Yū Niijima described as similar to Ghost in the Shell by Kai. Although there were many ideas submitted, it was felt that they were all somewhat lacking as something produced by Key. Maeda admitted that although there were interesting ideas submitted, none of them would make readers cry. Despite Maeda not originally planning to submit an idea himself, he offered one as an example, but he was surprised when his idea was instantly accepted as the basis for what would become Summer Pockets. Maeda decided not to write the scenario for the game due to similarities in themes with Key's visual novel Air (2000), which he primarily wrote.

Kai began expanding on the concept with Maeda sitting in on production meetings, but Maeda was later hospitalized, leading Kai to request that more writers be brought on for the project. Niijima had previously worked on visual novels for Saga Planets, another brand under Visual Arts, but he resigned from Saga Planets in 2012. Baba had suggested on multiple occasions that they bring in Niijima for a new project, leading to him being brought in as a scenario writer. Another scenario writer, Hasama, was added following his contributions to the scenario of the ports of Key's visual novel Kud Wafter (2010). Kai wrote the scenario for Ao's route, Niijima wrote both Shiroha's and Kamome's routes, and Hasama wrote Tsumugi's route.

Although the game is set on a fictional island, it features locations based on real places; the development staff went to Naoshima, Megijima and Ogijima to aid in this process. The use of nostalgia as a theme was important for Kai who likened Maeda's concept to the Boku no Natsuyasumi video game series. In addressing concerns about its similarity to Air, which also features a rural, seaside setting during the summer, Kai noted that Summer Pockets will have a completely different feeling to it due in part to the relationships the heroines have among each other and also from several charming male characters being featured in the game, similar to that of Little Busters! (2007) and Angel Beats! (2010). However, Maeda pointed out that the theme of the maternal bond featured in Air is also included in Summer Pockets.

Na-Ga is the chief artist and character designer for Summer Pockets, and three other artists were later brought in to produce additional character designs: Yūnon Nagayama, Tsubasu Izumi and Fumuyun. Nagayama had previously worked on the character design for Angel Beats! 1st Beat, and she was asked to join the staff for Summer Pockets due to her art being highly compatible with Na-Ga's illustrations. Kai was introduced to Izumi by Harumi Sakurai, the voice of Yuri Nakamura from Angel Beats!, and Kai had wanted to work with Izumi on a project for some time. Fumuyun joined the staff to provide character designs for two supporting characters. Super deformed characters are designed by Engiyoshi. The game's soundtrack was composed by Key's signature composers, Maeda and Shinji Orito, in addition to Donmaru, Tomohiro Takeshita and Ryō Mizutsuki.

Marketing and release
A nine-episode Internet radio show called  featuring Visual Arts president Takahiro Baba was streamed on YouTube from February 27 to March 26, 2018. Leading up to the release of Summer Pockets, 53 artists drew illustrations of the game's characters and offered comments from March 1 to June 29, 2018 to promote the game. A full-color introductory booklet called Summer Pockets Walker was distributed for free at anime and gaming stores across Japan starting on March 30, 2018. To advertise Summer Pockets, J.I.O Create took a 2007 Honda Stream RSZ and made it into an itasha (a car featuring illustrations of anime-styled characters) with images of the game's heroines. The car was driven around and showcased throughout Japan between May 3 and June 8, 2018. The car was put onto the Japanese Yahoo! Illustrator Engiyoshi drew 17 snippets featuring characters from Summer Pockets called  from May 14 to July 5, 2018. A series of 12 short stories were released on the game's website between October 31, 2018 and December 24, 2019 written by the game's scenario writers: Kai, Hasama, and Yū Niijima. The stories, subtitled , each focus on a separate character and feature illustrations by Fumuyun, one of the game's artists. The stories were later collected into a 144-page book with three additional stories and first sold as part of Visual Arts Winter Fes on December 20, 2020.

Key released a free game demo of Summer Pockets on April 24, 2018 on the game's official website. Summer Pockets was released on June 29, 2018 as a limited edition version for Windows. The limited edition came bundled with an official guide book titled , a remix album titled Swallow Tale, a rubber coaster, a microfiber cloth, a glow-in-the-dark sticker, and promotional cards from the Weiß Schwarz and Lycèe trading card games. Over two dozen stores in Akihabara and online offered special promotional items if the limited edition version of the game was bought at their store. These items included telephone cards, tapestries, mousepads, posters, a smartphone stand, and four separate drama CDs. The four drama CDs were later re-released with an additional drama CD titled Summer Pockets Drama CD Collection at Comiket 95 on December 29, 2018.

Summer Pockets was ported to iOS on December 17, 2018, and to Android on December 21, 2018. Prototype released a version on the Nintendo Switch on June 20, 2019. An English version for Windows was released by Visual Arts on February 5, 2020.

Reflection Blue
An upgraded version of the game titled Summer Pockets Reflection Blue was released on June 26, 2020 for Windows. Two separate editions were released: a limited edition, and a more expensive special edition that comes bundled with more content. Both editions came bundled with an official guide book titled , remix albums, and other promotional items totaling seven in all. The special edition was also bundled with an art book, an acrylic stand, a mini plush toy of Inari, a T-shirt, a necklace, a book jacket, and a Summer Pockets holographic card set. Leading up to its release, 23 artists drew illustrations of the game's characters and offered comments from March 3 to July 2, 2020 to promote the game. There were also five short one-shot manga drawn by separate authors released from June 4–22, 2020.

Originally conceived as a fan disc, Key later decided to release it as a new version of the game with various additions, and it is made by the same staff as the original game. Reflection Blue has four additional routes: two heroine routes for Miki Nomura and Shizuku Mizuori from Summer Pockets, a route for the new heroine Shiki Kamiyama, and a separate route for Umi Kato. Kai wrote the scenario for Miki's, Umi's and Shiki's routes, and Hasama wrote Shizuku's story. There are also new everyday life scenarios featuring the characters interacting and having fun together, and this includes an upgrade to the table tennis minigame. A 224-page art book titled Summer Pockets Visual Fanbook was released on May 24, 2019 by Visual Arts. The art book contains story summaries of the game's scenarios, information on the cast of characters, interviews from the production staff, and illustrations featuring art from the game. A 352-page revised edition of the art book with additional content from Reflection Blue titled Summer Pockets Reflection Blue Visual Fanbook was released on February 25, 2022 by Visual Arts.

Reflection Blue was ported to Android on August 20, 2020, and to iOS on April 27, 2021. Prototype released a version on the Nintendo Switch on July 1, 2021, and followed with a PlayStation 4 port on July 21, 2022.

Music

Summer Pockets has seven pieces of theme music: one opening theme, three ending themes, and three insert songs played during gameplay. The opening theme is  sung by Konomi Suzuki. The main ending theme is "Lasting Moment" sung by Suzuki, the ending theme for the Alka route is  sung by Runa Mizutani of the dōjin music group NanosizeMir, and the grand finale ending theme is  sung by Rionos. The three insert songs include  sung by Emiri Iwai,  sung by Konomi Kohara, and  sung by Yurika. Six of the main characters from Summer Pockets have background music leitmotifs—the original four heroines, plus Umi Kato and Ai Sorakado. Shiroha's themes are "White Loneliness" and "White with You"; Ao's theme is "Other side Blue"; Kamome's theme is 	"Adventure for Black"; Tsumugi's theme is "Golden Hours"; Umi's theme is "Twinkle of Alcor"; lastly, Ai's theme is "Deep Blue Blue".

Summer Pockets Reflection Blue has several more pieces of theme music in addition to those previously featured in Summer Pockets. The opening theme is  sung by Suzuki.  sung by Yurika is used as the ending theme for Shiki's route, and the grand finale ending theme is  sung by Rionos. There are five more inserts songs featured during gameplay:  sung by Mizutani,  sung by Kohara used during Shiroha's route,  sung by Natsumi Takamori used during Ao's route, and both "Departure!" and "With" sung by Tomomi Mineuchi used during Kamome's route. Five leitmotifs were added for the four additional heroines in Reflection Blue. Umi's themes include "Piece of Clear" and "Twinkle of Aster"; Miki's theme is "Splash Green"; Shizuku's theme is "Tender Purple"; finally, Shiki's theme is "Run Red Run".

The single for "Alkatale" was released in March 2018. As with several of Key's previous works, a music album came bundled with the limited edition release of the game; the album, released in June 2018, is titled Swallow Tale and contains remixes of eight tracks of the game's music. The Summer Pockets Original Soundtrack was released in September 2018. Two albums were released at Comiket 95 in December 2018: an image song album titled Sing! and a remix album titled Summer Session: Hito Natsu no Bōken. Two more remix albums followed in 2019: Seven's Sea in April, and Echoes of Summer in July. The single for "Asterlore" was released in April 2020. The remix album Edain came bundled with the limited and special editions version of Reflection Blue released in June 2020 and contains remixes of eight tracks of the game's music. Another remix album titled Summer Chronicle was released in August 2020 featuring tracks from Air, Kud Wafter and Summer Pockets. The single "Asterlore / Aoki Konata / Natsu no Sunadokei" was released in September 2020 containing theme music from Reflection Blue. Two more albums were released in December 2020: another image song album titled Sing! 2, and the Summer Pockets Reflection Blue Original Soundtrack. Each of the singles and albums released were on Key's record label Key Sounds Label.

Reception
Summer Pockets premiered as the No. 1 game sold on Getchu.com, a major redistributor of visual novel and domestic anime products, during the month of its release, and at No. 4 in July. It was later ranked as the No. 3 game sold on Getchu.com for the entirety of 2018. It was also the No. 1 most sold computer game on the Japanese Amazon for 12 consecutive weeks (excluding when it was sold out). Summer Pockets Reflection Blue occupied the top two spots for games sold on Getchu.com during the month of its release for the limited and special edition versions, and was ranked at No. 13 in July. It was later ranked as the No. 2 and 19 game sold (depending on the version). Reflection Blue occupied the top two spots for computer games sold in Japan during the week of June 22–28, 2020. Reflection Blue would go on to be ranked as the No. 3, 6 and 7 most sold computer games in 2020 (depending on the version) in Japan.

In the 2018 Bishōjo Game Awards sponsored by Getchu.com, Summer Pockets was ranked as No. 1 in the comprehensive, scenario, music, and demo movie categories, along with being ranked as No. 2 in the graphics category, No. 2 and 14 in the character category for Shiroha and Kamome, and ranked as No. 7 for the game system. In the 2020 Bishōjo Game Awards, Reflection Blue was ranked as No. 1 in the music category, along with being ranked as No. 2 in the demo movie category, No. 4 in the scenario category, No. 5 in both the comprehensive category and the character category for Shiki, and ranked as No. 6 for the game system. In the 2018 Moe Game Awards, Summer Pockets was awarded both the Grand Prize, the User Approval Award, and the Monthly Award for June 2018. In the 2020 Moe Game Awards, Reflection Blue was awarded the Best Theme Song Award for "Asterlore", and the Monthly Award for June 2020. The Nintendo Switch port of Reflection Blue in 2021 was reviewed by the Japanese video game magazine Famitsu, which gave it an overall score of 32/40 (out of the four individual review scores of 8, 8, 8, and 8).

Notes

References

External links
  
  
 

2018 video games
2020 video games
Android (operating system) games
Anime based on video games
Bishōjo games
IOS games
Key (company) games
Nintendo Switch games
PlayStation 4 games
Prototype (company) games
Romance video games
Single-player video games
Video games developed in Japan
Video games scored by Jun Maeda
Video games set in Japan
Video games set on fictional islands
Visual novels
Windows games